Nathaniel Edwards (1822–1880) was a New Zealand MP.

Nathaniel Edwards is also the name of:

Sir Nathaniel Edwards, 3rd Baronet (c. 1699–1764), of the Edwards baronets
Nathaniel Edwards (baseball), American baseball player

See also
Nate Edwards (1922–2016), American computer scientist
Weldon Nathaniel Edwards (1788–1873), North Carolina Congressional Representative
Edwards (surname)